The 1872 United States presidential election in Kansas took place on November 5, 1872, as part of the 1872 United States presidential election. Voters chose five representatives, or electors to the Electoral College, who voted for president and vice president.

Kansas voted for the Republican candidate, Ulysses S. Grant, over Liberal Republican candidate Horace Greeley. Grant won Kansas by a margin of 33.66%.

Results

See also
 United States presidential elections in Kansas

References

Kansas
1872
1872 Kansas elections